Swapnanchya Palikadle is an Indian Marathi-language television series which aired on Star Pravah. It starred Gauri Nalawade and Chinmay Udgirkar in lead roles.

Cast 
 Chinmay Udgirkar as Shreyas
 Gauri Nalawade as Vaidehi / Pavani
 Madhavi Nimkar-Kulkarni
 Tushar Dalvi
 Arun Nalawade
 Ashok Shinde
 Ajinkya Deo
 Kishori Shahane
 Usha Naik
 Madhavi Gogate
 Sharmila Shinde
 Aarti More
 Chaitrali Gupte
 Shekhar Navare
 Vikram Gaikwad
 Bharati Patil
 Rujuta Deshmukh
 Jyoti Malashe
 Vikas Patil
 Akshata Shinde
 Vinayak Bhave

Reception 
The show reran again on Star Pravah from 15 May to 19 August 2017.

In week 24 of 2011, it garnered 2.2 TVR maintaining second position. In week 5 of 2012, it garnered 4.2 TVR maintaining top position. In week 13 of 2012, it garnered 4.0 TVR maintaining second position.

References

External links 
 Swapnanchya Palikadle at Disney+ Hotstar
 

Marathi-language television shows
Star Pravah original programming
2010 Indian television series debuts
2014 Indian television series endings